Horizon Radio may refer to:

Heart 103.3, formerly Horizon Radio, of Milton Keynes, UK
Horizon FM, a radio station in Burkina Faso
Horizont (radio station) (or Horizon Radio), a Bulgarian radio station
Line-of-sight propagation, sometimes known as horizon radio
Over-the-horizon radar